Antal Szabó (4 September 1910 – 18 April 1972) was a Hungarian goalkeeper who played in the 1930s. Szabó was the goalkeeper for Hungary when they reached the World Cup final in 1938. Szabó expressed his relief following his side's defeat against Italy despite letting in four goals in the loss. Referring to Mussolini's pre-match threats (Il Duce had been misquoted as telling the Italian players to "Win or die"), Szabó quipped "I may have let in four goals, but at least I saved their lives".

At club level Szabó played for MTK Hungaria. In total he made 40 appearances for the Hungarian national team.

References

Hungarian footballers
Hungary international footballers
1934 FIFA World Cup players
1938 FIFA World Cup players
Association football goalkeepers
1910 births
1972 deaths